Krongsak Sakkasem  is a Thai former Muay Thai fighter and kickboxer.

Biography and career
At the age of 10 Krongsak was sent to Bangkok where he studied to become a monk. There he discovered Muay Thai through friends and finally joined the Sakksaem muay thai camp at the age of 12. Two years later he made his debut at Rajadamnern Stadium.

During his career Krongsak became the number 1 ranked fighter at both Rajadamnern and Lumpinee stadiums but never was able to capture the titles. At the peak of his popularity his purses reached 100,000 baht. He holds wins over notable champions of his time: Sagat Petchyindee, Jitti Kiatsuriya, Inseenoi Sor Thanikul, Raktae Muangsurin, Samart Prasarmrit and Changpuek Kiatsongrit.

in 1985 Krongsak fought the legendary Dieselnoi Chor Thanasukarn. They would fight to a draw at Rajadamnern Stadium on August 8, a fight a lot of observers thought Krongsak should have won. Dieselnoi would beat him on points in the rematch on November 12 at Lumpinee Stadium. Both fights at 132 lbs.

In 1988 Krongsak moved to France where he began teaching at the Lamy Gym in Paris. He kept competing both in Muay Thai and Kickboxing rules in Europe. He went undefeated in his second career, capturing world titles against notable European champions of his era such as Ivan Hippolyte, Rob Kaman, Stéphane Nikiéma and Guillaume Kerner. Krongsak retired from fighting in 1995 and turned to coaching full time, he also organized events in France cooperation with Thai promotors. He has been living in France for over 30 years.

Titles and accomplishments
 2x Thailand Champion (1984 & 1985)
World Muay Thai Association
 1988 W.M.T.A World Super Middleweight (-70 kg) Champion (defended five times)
World Kickboxing Association
 WKA World Super Welterweight Champion (defended twice)
Awards
 1985 Sports Writers Association of Thailand Fight of the Year (Aug 8th vs. Dieselnoi Chor Thanasukarn)

Fight record

|-  style="background:#cfc;"
| 1995-09-30 || Win ||align=left| Guillaume Kerner ||  ||  Évry, France || TKO (Doctor Stoppage)|| 3 || 
|-
! style=background:white colspan=9 |
|-  style="background:#cfc;"
| 1994- || Win ||align=left| Mustapha Lakhcem ||  ||  France || Decision || 10 ||2:00
|-
! style=background:white colspan=9 |
|-  style="background:#cfc;"
| 1993-12- || Win ||align=left| Stéphane Nikiéma || Salle des Sports Marcel Cerdan || Levallois, France || Decision || 5 || 3:00
|-
! style=background:white colspan=9 |
|-  style="background:#cfc;"
| 1993-06-04 || Win ||align=left| Stéphane Nikiéma || Stade Pierre de Coubertin || Paris, France || Decision (Unanimous)|| 5 || 3:00
|-
! style=background:white colspan=9 |

|-  style="background:#cfc;"
| 1992-04-24 || Win||align=left| Antoine Druif || || Hong Kong || KO || 1 ||

|-  style="background:#cfc;"
| 1992-04-11 || Win ||align=left| Andre Panza || Le 7ème Festival des Arts Martiaux ||  Paris, France || TKO (Punches)|| 9 || 

|-
! style=background:white colspan=9 |
|-  style="background:#cfc;"
| ? || Win ||align=left| Liam Walsh ||  || France || KO (Left Cross)|| 1 || 
|-
! style=background:white colspan=9 |
|-  bgcolor="#c5d2ea"
| 1991- || Draw ||align=left| Ivan Hippolyte || || Amsterdam, Netherlands || Decision || 5 || 3:00
|-  bgcolor="#cfc"
| 1989-11-23 || Win||align=left| Mike Cole || Lamy Gym présente BOXE-THAI || Paris, France || TKO (Left Straight)|| 1 ||
|-  bgcolor="#cfc"
| 1989- || Win||align=left| Pascal Grégoire ||  || Paris, France || KO || 2 ||
|-  bgcolor="#cfc"
| 1989-04- || Win||align=left| Ivan Hippolyte ||  || Paris, France || Decision || 5 || 3:00
|-
! style=background:white colspan=9 |
|-  style="background:#cfc;"
| 1988-02-06 || Win||align=left| Rob Kaman || || Paris, France || Decision || 5 || 3:00
|-
! style=background:white colspan=9 |
|-  style="background:#cfc;"
| 1987-10-30 || Win ||align=left| Changpuek Kiatsongrit ||  || Bangkok, Thailand || KO || 3 ||
|-  style="background:#cfc;"
| 1987-10-06 || Win ||align=left| Mapralong Sit Por Tor Thor ||  || Mueang Sakon Nakhon, Thailand ||  ||  ||

|-  style="background:#cfc;"
| 1987- || Win||align=left| Payap Premchai ||  ||Sakhon Nakhon, Thailand || Ref. stop (lack of combativity) || 4 ||
|-  style="background:#fbb;"
| 1987-03-06 || Loss||align=left| Changpuek Kiatsongrit ||  || Ubon Ratchathani province, Thailand || Decision|| 5||3:00
|-  style="background:#cfc;"
| 1986- || Win||align=left| Changpuek Kiatsongrit ||  || Thailand || Decision|| 5||3:00
|-  style="background:#cfc;"
| 1986- || Win ||align=left| Fahdaeng Sor.Borikan ||  || Thailand ||  ||  ||
|-  style="background:#cfc;"
| 1986- || Win ||align=left| Seeyok ||  || Thailand ||  ||  ||
|-  style="background:#fbb;"
| 1986- || Loss||align=left| Payap Premchai ||  ||Si Saket, Thailand || Ref. stop (lack of combativity) || 5 ||
|-  style="background:#cfc;"
| 1986- || Win ||align=left| Jock Kiatniwat||  || Thailand ||  ||  ||
|-  style="background:#cfc;"
| 1986- || Win ||align=left| Sawainoi Daopaetrew||  || Thailand ||  ||  ||
|-  style="background:#fbb;"
| 1986-05-17 || Loss||align=left| Nokweed Devy||  || Bangkok, Thailand || Decision ||5 ||3:00
|-  style="background:#cfc;"
| 1986- || Win ||align=left| Fanta Attapong ||  || Thailand ||  ||  ||
|-  style="background:#cfc;"
| 1986- || Win ||align=left| Samart Prasarnmit ||  ||  Thailand || KO  ||  ||
|-  style="background:#cfc;"
| 1986- || Win||align=left| Antoine Druif || || Clermont-Ferrand, France || TKO || 3 ||
|-  style="background:#cfc;"
| 1986- || Win||align=left| Orlando Wiet || || France || Decision || 5 || 3:00
|-  style="background:#cfc;"
| 1986- || Win||align=left| Rick van der Vathorst || || Paris, France || ||  ||
|-  style="background:#fbb;"
| 1985-11-12 || Loss||align=left| Dieselnoi Chor Thanasukarn || Lumpinee Stadium || Bangkok, Thailand || Decision || 5 || 3:00
|-
! style=background:white colspan=9 |
|-  style="background:#c5d2ea;"
| 1985-08-08 || Draw||align=left| Dieselnoi Chor Thanasukarn || Rajadamnern Stadium || Bangkok, Thailand || Decision || 5 || 3:00
|-  style="background:#cfc;"
| 1985-07-04|| Win ||align=left| Sawainoi Daopaetrew || Rajadamnern Stadium || Bangkok, Thailand || Decision|| 5  || 3:00
|-  style="background:#fbb;"
| 1985-04- || Loss ||align=left| Mekong Sor Borikan || Rajadamnern Stadium || Bangkok, Thailand || Decision || 5 || 3:00
|-  style="background:#cfc;"
| 1985-03-18|| Win ||align=left| Sagat Petchyindee|| Rajadamnern Stadium || Bangkok, Thailand || Decision|| 5  || 3:00

|-  style="background:#fbb;"
| 1984- || Loss ||align=left| Fanta Attapong||  || Bangkok, Thailand || Decision || 5 || 3:00
|-  style="background:#cfc;"
| 1984-04-06 || Win ||align=left| Jomtrai Petchyindee ||  || Nakhon Pathom, Thailand || Decision || 5 || 3:00
|-  style="background:#fbb;"
| 1984- || Loss ||align=left| Inseenoi Sor Thanikul || Rajadamnern Stadium || Bangkok, Thailand || Decision || 5 || 3:00
|-  style="background:#fbb;"
| 1984-01-05|| Loss||align=left| Kaopong Sitichuchai ||  Rajadamnern Stadium|| Bangkok, Thailand || Decision || 5|| 3:00
|-  style="background:#cfc;"
| 1983-11-03 || Win ||align=left| Inseenoi Sor Thanikul || Rajadamnern Stadium || Bangkok, Thailand || Decision || 5 || 3:00
|-  style="background:#cfc;"
| 1983-08-29 || Win ||align=left| Raktae Muangsurin || Rajadamnern Stadium || Bangkok, Thailand || Decision || 5 || 3:00
|-  style="background:#cfc;"
| 1982- || Win ||align=left| Fadaeng Sor Borikan ||  || Bangkok, Thailand || Decision || 5 || 3:00
|-  style="background:#cfc;"
| 1982-08-16 || Win ||align=left| Samart Prasarnmit || Rajadamnern Stadium || Bangkok, Thailand || KO || 4 ||
|-  style="background:#cfc;"
| 1982-07-21 || Win ||align=left| Samart Prasarnmit || Rajadamnern Stadium || Bangkok, Thailand || Decision || 5 || 3:00
|-  style="background:#cfc;"
| 1982-03-26 || Win ||align=left| Nakhonsawan Suanmisakwan || Lumpinee Stadium || Bangkok, Thailand || Decision || 5 || 3:00
|-  style="background:#cfc;"
| 1982-02-24 || Win ||align=left| Samart Prasarnmit || Rajadamnern Stadium || Bangkok, Thailand || Decision || 5 || 3:00
|-  style="background:#cfc;"
| 1982-01-27 || Win ||align=left| Lakchart Sor.Prasartporn|| Rajadamnern Stadium || Bangkok, Thailand || Decision || 5 || 3:00
|-  style="background:#fbb;"
| 1981- || Loss ||align=left| Ruengsak Petchyindee || Lumpinee Stadium || Bangkok, Thailand ||  Decision || 5 || 3:00
|-  style="background:#fbb;"
| 1981-11-03 || Loss ||align=left| Ruengsak Petchyindee || Lumpinee Stadium || Bangkok, Thailand || KO (Punches)||1 || 
|-
! style=background:white colspan=9 |
|-  style="background:#fbb;"
| 1981- || Loss ||align=left| Saeksan Sor.Thepittak || Rajadamnern Stadium || Bangkok, Thailand || Decision || 5 || 3:00
|-  style="background:#cfc;"
| 1981-08-21 || Win ||align=left| Sagat Petchyindee || Lumpinee Stadium || Bangkok, Thailand || Decision ||5 ||3:00
|-  style="background:#cfc;"
| 1981- || Win ||align=left| Saeksan Sor.Thepittak || Lumpinee Stadium || Bangkok, Thailand || Decision || 5 || 3:00
|-  style="background:#fbb;"
| 1981- || Loss ||align=left| Kaopong Sitichuchai || Lumpinee Stadium || Bangkok, Thailand || Decision ||5 ||3:00
|-  style="background:#cfc;"
| 1981-03-10 || Win ||align=left| Jitti Kiatsuriya || Lumpinee Stadium || Bangkok, Thailand || Decision || 5 || 3:00
|-  style="background:#cfc;"
| 1981- || Win ||align=left| Seeprae Fairtex || Lumpinee Stadium || Bangkok, Thailand || Decision || 5 || 3:00
|-  style="background:#cfc;"
| 1981-01-08 || Win ||align=left| Seeprae Fairtex || Rajadamnern Stadium || Bangkok, Thailand || Decision || 5 || 3:00
|-  style="background:#cfc;"
| 1980-11-25 || Win ||align=left| Sagat Petchyindee || Lumpinee Stadium || Bangkok, Thailand || Decision || 5 || 3:00
|-  style="background:#cfc;"
| 1980-11-03 || Win ||align=left| Dennarong Saksandee || Rajadamnern Stadium || Bangkok, Thailand || Decision || 5 || 3:00
|-  style="background:#fbb;"
| 1980-07-22 || Loss ||align=left| Lom Isan Sor Thanikul || Lumpinee Stadium || Bangkok, Thailand || KO (High Kick) || 4 || 
|-
! style=background:white colspan=9 |
|-  style="background:#cfc;"
| 1980-02-09 || Win ||align=left| Attapee Boonroj || Lumpinee Stadium || Bangkok, Thailand || Decision || 5 || 3:00
|-  style="background:#cfc;"
| 1980-01-21 || Win ||align=left| Fah-Uthai Phitsanurachan || Rajadamnern Stadium || Bangkok, Thailand || KO (Punches)|| 2 ||
|-  style="background:#cfc;"
|  || Win ||align=left| Densuk Florida|| || Bangkok, Thailand ||Decision || 5 || 3:00
|-  style="background:#cfc;"
| 1979-09-07 || Win ||align=left| Kwangtongnoi Kiatsingnoi ||Lumpinee Stadium || Bangkok, Thailand || Decision || 5 || 3:00
|-  style="background:#cfc;"
|  || Win ||align=left| Yodkhunsuk Kiatsingnoi|| || Bangkok, Thailand ||Decision || 5 || 3:00
|-  style="background:#cfc;"
|  || Win ||align=left| Samoechai Ketsongkran|| || Bangkok, Thailand || KO ||  ||
|-  style="background:#cfc;"
|  || Win ||align=left| Win Kisaiphodeang|| || Bangkok, Thailand || Decision || 5 || 3:00
|-  style="background:#cfc;"
|  || Win ||align=left| Chalamsing Sakwichian|| || Bangkok, Thailand ||Decision || 5 || 3:00
|-  style="background:#cfc;"
|  || Win ||align=left| Yodphon Phongsit|| || Bangkok, Thailand || Decision || 5 || 3:00
|-  style="background:#cfc;"
|  || Win ||align=left| Rungsai Kiatpetch || || Bangkok, Thailand || Decision || 5 || 3:00
|-  style="background:#cfc;"
|  || Win ||align=left| Lap Or Yuthanakorn|| || Bangkok, Thailand ||Decision || 5 || 3:00
|-  style="background:#cfc;"
| 1978-04-07 || Win ||align=left| Ekasit Kor.Kerdphol|| Lumpinee Stadium || Bangkok, Thailand ||Decision || 5 || 3:00
|-
| colspan=9 | Legend:

See also
List of male kickboxers

References 

1963 births
Living people
Krongsak Sakkasem
Krongsak Sakkasem
Krongsak Sakkasem